Commonwealth Avenue may refer to:

 Commonwealth Avenue (Boston), Massachusetts
 Commonwealth Avenue (Canberra), Australia
 Commonwealth Avenue, Hillingdon, London, England
 Commonwealth Avenue, Merrick, New York
 Commonwealth Avenue, Quezon City, Philippines
 Commonwealth Avenue, Shepherd's Bush, London, England
 Commonwealth Avenue, Singapore

See also
 Commonwealth (disambiguation)
 Commonwealth Avenue Historic District (disambiguation)